Mazzotta is an Italian surname. Notable people with the surname include:

Anna Mazzotta (born 1970), British artist
Antonio Mazzotta (born 1989), Italian footballer
Federico Mazzotta (1839–1897), Italian painter
Giuseppe Mazzotta, American historian
Peppino Mazzotta (born 1971), Italian actor
Riccarda Mazzotta (born 1986), Swiss cyclist
Roberto Mazzotta (born 1940), Italian economist and politician 

Italian-language surnames